1124 Stroobantia, provisional designation , is a metallic asteroid from the outer region of the asteroid belt, approximately 25 kilometers in diameter. It was discovered on 6 October 1928, by Belgian astronomer Eugène Delporte at Uccle Observatory in Belgium. It is named for astronomer Paul Stroobant.

Description 

Stroobantia orbits the Sun at a distance of 2.8–3.0 AU once every 5.01 years (1,829 days). Its orbit has an eccentricity of 0.03 and an inclination of 8° with respect to the ecliptic.

Physical characteristics 

In the Tholen taxonomy, Stroobantia is classified as a generic X-type asteroid. It was grouped it into the metallic subcategory of M-type asteroid by a spectroscopic survey of X-type asteroids using the TNG, NTT and IRTF telescopes.

Rotation period 

Two fragmentary rotational lightcurves of Stroobantia were obtained from photometric observations by Ricardo Gil-Hutton at the Félix Aguilar Observatory in Argentina, and by French amateur astronomers Laurent Bernasconi. Lightcuve analysis gave a rotation period of 16.39 and 17.0 hours with a brightness amplitude of 0.15 and 0.06 magnitude, respectively.

Diameter and albedo 

According to the surveys carried out by the Infrared Astronomical Satellite IRAS, the Japanese Akari satellite, and NASA's Wide-field Infrared Survey Explorer with its subsequent NEOWISE mission, Stroobantia measures between 24.45 and 29.68 kilometers in diameter, and its surface has an albedo between 0.108 and 0.1569. The Collaborative Asteroid Lightcurve Link adopts the results obtained by IRAS, that is, an albedo of 0.1569 and a diameter of 24.65 kilometers with an absolute magnitude of 10.67.

Naming 

This minor planet was named for Paul Stroobant (1868–1936), Belgian astronomer and director of the Uccle Observatory, where this asteroid was discovered. Stroobant's research included the number, mass and distribution of the minor planets. Naming citation was first mentioned in The Names of the Minor Planets by Paul Herget in 1955.

References

External links 
 Obituary: Paul Stroobant, The Observatory, Vol. 59, p. 349-352 (1936) 
 Asteroid Lightcurve Database (LCDB), query form (info )
 Dictionary of Minor Planet Names, Google books
 Asteroids and comets rotation curves, CdR – Observatoire de Genève, Raoul Behrend
 Discovery Circumstances: Numbered Minor Planets (1)-(5000) – Minor Planet Center
 
 

001124
Discoveries by Eugène Joseph Delporte
Named minor planets
001124
19281006